Armed Forces Training Authority is one of the Egyptian Ministry of Defence agencies and is the only body mandated training for each individual fighters in the Egyptian Armed Forces.

Military education and training in Egypt
Defence agencies of Egypt